Pirqoi ben Baboi, also written Pirqoi ben Babui, was a Babylonian scholar of the Talmud who lived sometime in the 8th–9th century.  He is chiefly remembered for a polemical letter he wrote, addressed to all places in Afriqiya and Sfarad, but thought to be directed in particular to the Qeirwān Jewish community in Tunisia concerning the traditions of Eretz Israel. His writings have been called 'one of the most intriguing Babylonian Jewish texts to have survived the vicissitudes of history'.

Biography
The precise dates of his floruit are unknown, except that context suggests he lived around 800 CE. His unusual name Pirqoi seems to be a Persian personal name, with Jacob Nahum Epstein inferring from this hypothesis that he must have been born and raised in Babylonia. The alternative view, advanced by Louis Ginzberg is that he was a native of Eretz Israel who emigrated and settled in Babylonia to pursue his studies. The latter theory fits well with the fact of his familiarity with Palestinian usages and texts.

He was a disciple of Rav(a)Abba/Rabah who had in turn sat at the feet of Yehudai Gaon, with some sources saying Pirquoi ben Baboi studied under both. He is associated with both the Sura and Pumbedita academies.

Background
After the Muslim conquest of Iraq, Babylonian rabbis retained strong memories of their communal life under the Sasanian Empire. Politically, the entire Middle East had now come under unified Islamic rule but, like some Syrian Christian writers such as John of Fenek, Pirqoi ben Baboi evoked in exaggerated terms the pre-existing geopolitical division as still marking a cultural rift between the tranquil life of Jews from Sasanian times onward and Jewish communities to the west under Byzantine authority, characterized by endemic persecutions. The ostensible difference was deployed to buttress Babylonian Jewry's claims to superiority over those in Palestine/Eretz Israel, whose legal customs were a result of persecution (minhagei shmad). Pirqoi ben Baboi would cite a verse from Daniel 7:5 'and three ribs were between his teeth' as prophetic of the sway which the evil empires of Greece and Rome (Edom) would subsequently exercise, to the detriment of proper Torah traditions, over communities to the west of Babylonia, taking the line to be an allusion to the fate of Harran, Nisibis and Adiabene. The Jewish communities in Babylonia, he falsely asserts by ignoring the evidence of the late Sasanian period, never suffered persecution.

Work
He became known for his Iggeret, according to Ginsberg the earliest extant halakhic work surviving from the Geonic period, an epistle to the Jews of Kairouan in Tunisia. This epistle, the first known example of its kind for advocating the dissemination of the Babylonian Talmud, dated to around 800/810 came to light from its discovery among the Geniza records. It contains a polemical attack on what he regarded as the ignorant customs prevailing among Palestinian Jews of Eretz Israel (minhagei eretz yisrael) at that time, beliefs and practices which had, he argued, spread to major centres of Talmudic learning in North Africa, such as Kairouan, from which they radiated out in turn further west to Spain.

This iggeret, a virulent broadside against the Land of Israel/Palestine, which was held in high reverence in Jewish communities, and the whole Palestinian rabbinical tradition, might have struck its readership as scandalous. Though widely distributed, did not appear to have much effect on the community it addressed, since Palestinian influences remained strong there centuries later, as one can see from Sherira Gaon 's Iggeret to Kairouan and in the work of his son Hai Gaon. However the arguments made are echoed in broader diatribes and defenses of piyyut in much later times.

The claim to a superior authority in religious matters was buttressed by the claim that the Babylonian academies, namely the Torah sages according to the Seder Olam Rabbah, departed, with Jeconiah, to Babylon 12 years prior to the Siege and destruction of Jerusalem in 586, and only after their safety was secured was permission granted to destroy Jerusalem and its Temple. The exile itself was, he argued, an 'act of charity (tzedakah)' by God. The Babylonian yeshivot conserved the strength (gevurah) of the Jewish contingent of troops (gibborim) who had formed part of the earlier evacuation, so that the Babylonian scholars, heirs to this exile of the strong, were themselves warriors (gibborei) of Torah.

In terms of his rhetoric of persuasion, Pirqoi ben Baboi's mode of thought evinces three simple assumptions:

 What distinguishes Babylonian Judaism from its Palestinian counterpart is that the former never experienced persecution (shemad), whereas it was continuous with the latter.
 The persecutions in Palestine broke the transmission of the Oral Torah there.
 Therefore, the authentic Judaic tradition is conserved in Babylon. That in Palestine is unreliable.

His driving aspiration was to impose the halakhic hegemony of the Babylonian academies over all Jewish communities, and thereby undermine the diaspora's attachment to Eretz Israel. Only the legal code as laid down in the Babylonian Talmud was a reliable basis for practice of the oral law throughout the world. Any custom (minhag) which disagreed with the Babylonian rabbinical canon he considered a "custom of apostasy", which he imagined Edom/Rome had imposed on the Jews of Palestine.

It has been suspected, in this last regard, that the virulence of his censure stems from anxiety over the rise of the Karaites – some of whose positions had been inflected by Palestinian usage- who refused to accept the oral teachings encoded in Babylonian rabbinical texts. The Karaites, for example, considered fasting on the Sabbath laudable, just as Italian Jews since late antiquity allowed the practice on particular occasions. In the latter instance, this may reflect the persistence of a residue of popular Palestinian traditions of piety notwithstanding strictures against the practice issued by authoritative rabbis.

Pirqoi ben Baboi frowned on any such deviation from what was established Babylonian practice. These perceived abuses extended to the scrolls of the Torah produced in Palestine, which, he stated, were written on vellum prepared by Gentiles in disregard for halakhic stipulations on their proper production.

A fragment of Pirqoi ben Baboi's appears to contain, in the form of a quotation, the earliest extant reference to Pirkei De-Rabbi Eliezer, and plays some role in arguments for dating that work.

The historical context of Pirqoi's critique
In ancient Greece, a distinction developed between súngramma (σύγγραμμα) and hupómnēma (ὑπόμνημα), namely an authorized copy of a book and the private notes made on it. With the rise of Hellenism, this discrimination influenced Palestinian rabbis when they in turn drew a sharp line of demarcation between the Tanakh scriptural corpus, and extra-biblical oral teachings, ascribing greater importance to this Oral Torah than to the written Torah. According to one source, the Pesikta Rabbati, God turned town Moses' request at Sinai that the Oral Torah be written down: he did so to avoid a repetition of what would happen with the Old Testament, i.e. be translated into Greek and allow gentiles other than Jews to proclaim themselves 'children of Israel'. For much of the Geonic period, the Talmud was conserved primarily in oral transmission.

In his letter, Pirqoi ben Baboi remonstrated with the Kairouan community arguing that it was not sufficient to cite written texts in laying down Jewish law. The position of Yehudai Gaon was that applied halakhic rulings could not be made simply by citing halakha from the Tanakh, Mishna, or Talmud. The prescriptive authority of a Jewish law could only be vouchsafed if a living master ruled that it was known to be implemented in practice (halakhah le-ma'aseh). Written aide-mémoires from the oral tradition (nushaot), or from a megilat setarim (sequestered scroll), were devoid of cultural authority since they were not authorized, as were girsaot, by a master of the oral law linked to the chain of tradition.  Pirqoi ben Baboi's construal of the relevant sugya in the Talmud is, however, arguably unique in inferring from the conditions set for making halakhah le-ma'aseh the idea that the only valid method for transmitting the Oral Torah must be itself oral.

The problem with Palestinian rabbis, in his view, was that in eliciting passages inscribed from the Mishna and Talmud, some of them 'hidden' (genuzin), each imposed their personal interpretation upon them. The Babylonian practice exemplified by Yehudai Gaon was that Talmud legal teachings are validated only if they can be corroborated by living masters familiar with non-textual traditions, the chain of oral judgments, consensus and customary usage.

The Greek distinction whose impact is at work in these controversies was transmitted in a similar form to Islamic culture, where, after the establishment of the Qur'an text, there arose fierce opposition, particularly in areas best known for having by heart these stories, such as Basra and Kufa, to the inscription of the accompanying oral traditions. Scholars like Ibn Sa'd (784–845) vehemently argued that Muslims ought not to repeat what Islamic jurists conceived to be the theological error in Judaism, of writing down the Mathnā (i.e. the Mishna). Such practices would only invest teachers with an authority comparable to the foundational text of the Qur'an itself. This hostility to the written, as opposed to oral, recording of what Muhammad was remembered as having said, namely the ḥadīth, prevailed under the Umayyad Caliphate until Umar II (r. 717–720) ordered that an official compendium (tadwīn) of ḥadīth be made. Human memory was frail, and notes (atraf) had been made, but like nushaot, these were to remain secreted away.

Gregor Schoeler. analyzing fulminations impugning the Umayyad dynasty's legitimacy, correlated the genre hostile to the inscription of hadith with the fall of the Umayyads. They had broken a powerful taboo. The scholars frequently vindicated the Abbasid Caliphate which followed, and the new dynasty had empowered rule by Islamic jurists (fuqahā). Extrapolating from this, Talya Fishman wonders whether there is not some broad connection between this phenomenon in Islam and the remonstrations made by Yehudai Gaon and, later, Pirqoi ben Baboi. Jews outside of Eretz Israel called their Palestinian brethren Shami or 'Damascenes', and the Babylonian school's hostility to Palestinian traditions might be embedded in a broader cultural battle, in which the Abbasids found themselves in rivalry with the Syro-Palestinian communities, in Umayyad territories to their west, around the Mediterranean.

Prayer
Pirqoi ben Baboi was particularly concerned with prayer orthodoxy. He quotes his teacher Yehudai Gaon for an halakhic ban on non-Talmudic blessings, stating that unless a blessing is in the Talmud it may not be uttered, or modified even in a single letter. The Palestinian Jewish creation of piyyut came under intense fire as the geonic scholars strove to exercise their hegemony in terms of a correct halakhically defined liturgy. This remonstrance by the circle of Yehudai Gaon was shrugged off by the community in Palestine with their traditional dismissal: minhag (custom) nullifies halakha (minhag mevattel halakhah: מנהג מבטל הלכה).

Like Yehudai Gaon, he was opposed to the recitation of the Shema in the Kedushah. Historically this innovation arose when, Jacob Mann opined, Heraclius, breaking a promise he had made to the Jews, wrested sway over Palestine from the Sassanian Persians and their former Jewish allies, and proscribed recitation of the daily Tefillah and Shema. Since they were allowed only to congregate in their synagogues on the morning of the Sabbath to recite the Amidah and associated piyyutim, the Hazzan or precentor adopted the subterfuge of smuggling the banned prayer in, intoning the first and last lines of the Shema in such away as to slip by the eavesdropping of government officials monitoring the session.  Pirqoi ben Baboi repeated his stance of Yehudai Gaon that the raison d'être for such a novel practice had vanished with the Muslim conquest of Palestine, and the overthrow of Byzantine rule. Therefore, it was necessary to remove the Shema from the kedushah of the Shacharit Amidah, since under Arab rule it was now possible to return to the normal prayer practices in place prior to Christian Byzantium rule. Pirqoi ben Baboi nonetheless did not require that the Shema be removed from the Mussaf Kedushah, a widespread Jewish ritual in Babylonia and one that also preserved an innovation made at a time of persecution.

Notes

Citations

Sources

8th-century rabbis
9th-century rabbis